Erjon is an Albanian masculine given name. It is a spelling variant of Erion, and means "Our Wind". One theory is that it is of mythological origin. The name may refer to:

Erjon Bogdani (born 1977), Albanian footballer
Erjon Dollapi (born 1993), Albanian-born British rugby player 
Erjon Dushku (born 1985), Albanian footballer
Erjon Kastrati (born 1994), Kosovar-Albanian basketball player
Erjon Llapanji (born 1985), Albanian footballer 
Erjon Mustafaj (born 1989), Albanian footballer
Erjon Rizvanolli (born 1981), Albanian footballer
Erjon Tola (born 1986), Albanian skier
Erjon Vuçaj (born 1990), Albanian footballer

References

Albanian masculine given names